Oka is the capital city of Akoko South-West Local Government of Ondo State, Nigeria.

Local Government Areas in Ondo State